Glyphipterix californiae is a species of sedge moth in the genus Glyphipterix. It was described by Walsingham in 1881. It is found in California.

References

Moths described in 1881
Glyphipterigidae
Moths of North America